Daqiao is a town of Hejiang County in southeastern Sichuan province, China, located in gently rolling hills about  south of the Yangtze River and  east of downtown Luzhou. , it has one residential community and 15 villages under its administration.

References 

Towns in Sichuan
Hejiang County